The Federation of Norwegian Coastal Shipping (RLF) is an employers' organisation in Norway, organized under the national Confederation of Norwegian Enterprise.

The current director is Harald Thomassen. Chairman of the board is Geir E. Aga.

The Federation of Norwegian Coastal Shipping is both an employers federation and an industrial association. The federation which is an organization within NHO (The Confederation of Norwegian Business and Industry), is representing more than 50 shipping companies with a total of 5.500 employed seamen on board approximately 400 ships in coastal trade.  
 
The members of the federation cover a broad range of business as e.g. car ferries, fast passenger crafts, coastal express steamers, tugs, cargo ships, tankers, reefers, cable ships and rescue boats. 

Employers' organisations in Norway
Shipping trade associations